The 1942 season of the Primera División Peruana, the top category of Peruvian football, was played by 10 teams. The national champions were Sport Boys. From 1931 until 1942 the points system was W:3, D:2, L:1, walkover:0.

Results

Standings

External links 
 Peru 1942 season at RSSSF
 Peruvian Football League News 

Peru1
Peruvian Primera División seasons
1942 in Peruvian football